The 2019 Mid-Eastern Athletic Conference men's basketball tournament was the postseason men's basketball tournament for the Mid-Eastern Athletic Conference. The tournament was held from March 11 through March 16, 2019 at the Norfolk Scope in Norfolk, Virginia. North Carolina Central defeated Norfolk State 50–47 in the championship game to win the tournament, and received the conference's automatic bid to the 2019 NCAA tournament. It was the third consecutive championship for North Carolina Central, and fourth in the last six seasons.

Seeds 
11 teams were seeded by record within the conference, with a tiebreaker system to seed teams with identical conference records. The top four teams received a first round bye. Florida A&M is ineligible for postseason play due to APR violations.

Schedule

Bracket

* denotes overtime period

References

2018–19 Mid-Eastern Athletic Conference men's basketball season
MEAC men's basketball tournament
2019 in sports in Virginia
Basketball competitions in Norfolk, Virginia
College basketball tournaments in Virginia